Arophyteae is a tribe in the family Araceae.  It contains three genera Colletogyne, Carlephyton, and Arophyton. All species in Arophyteae are endemic to Madagascar.

References

Bown, Deni (2000). Aroids: Plants of the Arum Family. Timber Press. .

Monocot tribes